Iveta Benešová and Barbora Záhlavová-Strýcová were the defending champions. They reached the final, where they lost to Timea Bacsinszky and Tathiana Garbin 4–6, 4–6.

Seeds

Draw

Draw

References
 Doubles Draw

Luxembourg Open
BGL Luxembourg Open - Doubles
2010 in Luxembourgian tennis